Frederick I of Hesse-Homburg (5 March 1585, at Lichtenberg Castle in Fischbachtal – 9 May 1638, in Bad Homburg), was the first Landgrave of Hesse-Homburg and founder of the eponymous family line.

Life 
Frederick was the youngest son of Count George I of Hesse-Darmstadt (1547–1596) from his first marriage to Magdalene (1552–1587), daughter of Count VIII Bernhard of Lippe.

Frederick did not have any rights to inherit, because in Hesse-Darmstadt primogeniture had been introduced properly.  Nevertheless, Frederick received in 1622 an apanage consisting of the City and district of Homburg, as well as a one-off payment plus an annual sum.  He was not considered a sovereign prince, but fell under the sovereignty of Hesse-Darmstadt.  In 1626, he introduced primogeniture in Hesse-Homburg.

One of his sons was Frederick II of Hesse-Homburg, better known as The Prince of Homburg.

Marriage and issue 
Frederick I married on 10 August 1622 in Butzbach with Margaret Elisabeth (1604–1667), daughter of Count Christopher of Leiningen-Westerburg.  They had the following children:
 Louis Philippe (1623–1643)
 George  (1624–1624)
 William Christoph (1625–1681), Landgrave of Hesse-Homburg
 married firstly in 1650 Princess Sophia Eleonore of Hesse-Darmstadt (1634–1663)
 married secondly in 1665 Princess Anna Elisabeth of Saxe-Lauenburg (1624–1688)
 George Christian (1626–1677)
 married in 1666 Anna Catherine of Pogwisch, widow of von Ahlefeldt (1633–1694)
 Anna Margaret (1629–1686)
 married in 1650 Duke  Philip Louis of Schleswig-Holstein-Sonderburg-Wiesenburg (1620–1689)
 Frederick II (1633–1708), Landgrave of Hesse-Homburg, better known as The Prince of Homburg
 married firstly in 1661 Countess Margareta Brahe (1603–1669), widow of Johan Oxenstierna
 married secondly in 1670 Princess Louise Elisabeth of Courland (1646–1690)
 married thirdly in 1691 Countess Sophia Sibylle of Leiningen-Westerburg, widow of the Count of Leiningen-Dagsburg (1656–1724)

References 
Karl Wenzeslaus Rodecker von Rotteck: Staats-lexikon oder Encyclopädie der Staatswissenschaften p. 739
Claudia Tietz: Johann Winckler (1642–1705) p. 114

External links 
 Friedrich, in: Heinrich August Pierer, Julius Löbe (eds.): :de:Universal-Lexikon der Gegenwart und Vergangenheit, fourth ed., vol. 6, pp. 722–740, Online at zeno.org

House of Hesse-Homburg
1585 births
1638 deaths
Landgraves of Hesse
17th-century German people